In chemistry, the hydron, informally called proton, is the cationic form of atomic hydrogen, represented with the symbol . The general term "hydron", endorsed by the IUPAC, encompasses cations of hydrogen regardless of their isotopic composition: thus it refers collectively to protons (1H+) for the protium isotope, deuterons (2H+ or D+) for the deuterium isotope, and tritons (3H+ or T+) for the tritium isotope.

Unlike most other ions, the hydron consists only of a bare atomic nucleus.  The negatively charged counterpart of the hydron is the hydride anion, .

Properties

Solute properties
Other things being equal, compounds that readily donate hydrons (Brønsted acids, see below) are generally polar, hydrophilic solutes and are often soluble in solvents with high relative static permittivity (dielectric constants).  Examples include organic acids like acetic acid (CH3COOH) or methanesulfonic acid (CH3SO3H).  However, large nonpolar portions of the molecule may attenuate these properties.  Thus, as a result of its alkyl chain, octanoic acid (C7H15COOH) is considerably less hydrophilic compared to acetic acid.

The unsolvated hydron (a completely free or "naked" hydrogen atomic nucleus) does not exist in the condensed (liquid or solid) phase.  Although superacids are sometimes said to owe their extraordinary hydron-donating power to the presence of "free hydrons", such a statement is highly misleading: even for a source of "free hydrons" like , one of the superacidic cations present in the superacid fluoroantimonic acid (HF:SbF5), detachment of a free  still comes at an enormous energetic penalty on the order of several hundred kcal/mol.  This effectively rules out the possibility of the free hydron being present in solution, even as a fleeting intermediate. For this reason, in liquid strong acids, hydrons are believed to diffuse by sequential transfer from one molecule to the next along a network of hydrogen bonds through what is known as the Grotthuss mechanism.

Acidity
The hydron ion can incorporate an electron pair from a Lewis base into the molecule by adduction:
 + :L → 
Because of this capture of the Lewis base (L), the hydron ion has Lewis acidic character.  In terms of Hard/Soft Acid Base (HSAB) theory, the bare hydron is an infinitely hard Lewis acid. 

The hydron plays a central role in Brønsted–Lowry acid–base theory: a species that behaves as a hydron donor in a reaction is known as the Brønsted acid, while the species accepting the hydron is known as the Brønsted base.  In the generic acid–base reaction shown below, HA is the acid, while B (shown with a lone pair) is the base: 
 + :B →  + :A–
The hydrated form of the hydrogen cation, the hydronium (hydroxonium) ion (aq), is a key object of Arrhenius' definition of acid. Other hydrated forms, the Zundel cation , which is formed from a proton and two water molecules, and the Eigen cation , which is formed from a hydronium ion and three water molecules, are theorized to play an important role in the diffusion of protons though an aqueous solution according to the Grotthuss mechanism.  Although the ion (aq) is often shown in introductory textbooks to emphasize that the hydron is never present as an unsolvated species in aqueous solution, it is somewhat misleading, as it oversimplifies infamously complex speciation of the solvated proton in water; the notation (aq) is often preferred, since it conveys aqueous solvation while remaining noncommittal with respect to the number of water molecules involved.

Isotopes of hydron

Proton, having the symbol p or 1H+, is the +1 ion of protium, 1H.
Deuteron, having the symbol 2H+ or D+, is the +1 ion of deuterium, 2H or D.
Triton, having the symbol 3H+ or T+, is the +1 ion of tritium, 3H or T.
Other isotopes of hydrogen are too unstable to be relevant in chemistry.

History of the term
The term "hydron" is recommended by IUPAC to be used instead of "proton" if no distinction is made between the isotopes proton, deuteron and triton, all found in naturally occurring undifferentiated isotope mixtures. The name "proton" refers to isotopically pure 1H+.
On the other hand, referring to the hydron as simply hydrogen ion is not recommended because hydrogen anions also exist. 

The term "hydron" was defined by IUPAC in 1988.
Traditionally, the term "proton" was and is used in place of "hydron".
The latter term is generally only used in the context where comparisons between the various isotopes of hydrogen is important (as in the kinetic isotope effect or hydrogen isotopic labeling). Otherwise, referring to hydrons as protons is still considered acceptable, for example in such terms as protonation, deprotonation, proton pump, or proton channel. Acid and bases are referred to as proton donors and acceptors correspondingly.

99.9844% of natural hydrons (hydrogen nuclei) are protons, and the remainder (about 156 per million in sea water) are deuterons (see deuterium), except for some very rare natural tritons (see tritium).

See also
Deprotonation
Dihydrogen cation
Hydrogen ion cluster
Solvated electron
Superacid
Trihydrogen cation

References

Cations
Hydrogen
Proton